Mohamed Brahimi (born 17 September 1998) is a French footballer who plays as a winger for Russian club Fakel Voronezh on loan from the Bulgarian club Botev Plovdiv.

Career
Brahimi started his career in Vaulx-en-Velin, before moving to Bulgaria and joining Tsarsko Selo Sofia in 2020. He moved to Second League team Neftochimic Burgas in March 2021 and had a crucial impact in their late retain in the league. His good play lead him to return in the top level football, signing a contract with the newly promoted team Pirin Blagoevgrad in June 2021.

On 12 January 2022, Brahimi moved to Botev Plovdiv for undisclosed transfer fee.

On 3 February 2023, Brahimi joined Fakel Voronezh in the Russian Premier League on loan.

References

External links
 

1998 births
Living people
French footballers
Association football midfielders
Hauts Lyonnais players
FC Vaulx-en-Velin players
FC Tsarsko Selo Sofia players
Neftochimic Burgas players
PFC Pirin Blagoevgrad players
Botev Plovdiv players
FC Fakel Voronezh players
First Professional Football League (Bulgaria) players
Second Professional Football League (Bulgaria) players
Russian Premier League players
French expatriate footballers
Expatriate footballers in Bulgaria
French expatriate sportspeople in Bulgaria
Expatriate footballers in Russia
French expatriate sportspeople in Russia